Polapi is a peak in Chile with an elevation of  metres, at the Puna de Atacama region. It is located within the territory of the Chilean province of El Loa. Its slopes are within the administrative boundaries of two Chilean cities: Calama and Ollagüe.

Elevation 
Data from the digital elevation models TanDEM-X yields the 5988 metre elevation. The height of the nearest key col is 4890 meters, leading to a topographic prominence of 1070 meters. Polapi is considered a Mountain Massif according to the Dominance System  and its dominance is 17.95%. Its parent peak is Palpana and the Topographic isolation is 17.5 kilometers.

References

External links 
 Elevation information about Polapi
 Weather Forecast at Polapi

Stratovolcanoes of Chile